= YCL064C =

YCL064C is a gene in the genome of Saccharomyces cerevisiae, the most common species of yeast. Its function is the catalyzation of the degradation of both L-serine and L-threonine. In order to survive using serine or threonine as the sole nitrogen source, YCL064C must be present and functional. It is transcriptionally induced by the presence of Lserine and Lthreonine. The gene is 360 amino acids in length, and is also known under the synonym of CHA1.
